is a Japanese voice actress and singer. She is currently affiliated with Holy Peak. She is known for her role as You Watanabe in the multimedia franchise Love Live! Sunshine!!. She is also an idol in the unit Aqours, for the same franchise. In 2019, she made her solo debut as a musician under Sacra Music with the mini album . Later that year, she released the single ; the song "Papapa" was used as the opening theme to the anime series Oresuki.

Biography
Shuka Saitō was born on August 16, 1996, the youngest of four children. She has an older sister and two brothers. She attended a hip-hop course in the fourth grade of elementary school, which had a great influence on her career aspirations at an early age. She took dance lessons until the third year of high school. In the second year of high school she also took singing lessons.

In 2015, Saitō attended an audition for the role of You Watanabe from the anime television series Love Live! Sunshine!! part and got the role. She is part of the fictional group Aqours, which belongs to the Love Live! Franchise, and has released several singles with the group, which are very successful in Japan and some of which have received a gold record. At the eleventh Seiyū Awards in 2017, she received the Singing Award as a member of Aqours.

Shuka Saitō had other speaking roles in the anime television series OreSuki as Asaka Mayama. She also interpreted the song in the opening credits of the series with Papapa. In 2021 she had main speaking roles in anime television series Wonder Egg Priority as Rika Kawai. In addition, she spoke various characters in various video games, including Phantasy Star Online, Granblue Fantasy, Hakoniwa Company works and Dolls Order.

In June 2019. Saitō announced that she would also work as a solo musician and signed a record deal with the Japanese music label Sacra Music.

Filmography

Anime television series
Love Live! Sunshine!! (2016–17) as You Watanabe
Time Bokan 24 (2016) as Child (ep 5)
Time Bokan 24 (2017) as Child B (ep 14)
Oresuki (2019) as Asaka "Sasanqua" Mayama
D4DJ First Mix (2020) as DJ Misamisa (ep 2)
Wonder Egg Priority (2021) as Rika Kawai
Akebi's Sailor Uniform (2022) as Miki Fukumoto
A Herbivorous Dragon of 5,000 Years Gets Unfairly Villainized (2023) as Water Saint (Japanese dub)
Genjitsu no Yohane: Sunshine in the Mirror (2023) as You Watanabe

Video games
Love Live! School Idol Festival (2016) as You Watanabe
Uchi no Hime-sama ga Ichiban Kawaii (2016) as Amaterasu
Dragon Genesis -bonds of holy war- (2017) as Proserpina
Phantasy Star Online 2 es (2017) as Kae Traitor
Hakoniwa Company Works (2017) as Meme Kazamidori
Phantasy Star Online 2 es (2017) as Assassin Claw
Phantasy Star Online 2 es (2017 as Evil Pirikanet
Dolls Order (2018) as Lohengrin
Qbit (2018) as Karasu Kayakari
Granblue Fantasy (2019) as You Watanabe
Love Live! School Idol Festival All Stars (2019) as You Watanabe
Miko Note (2022) as Yumi Amano
Samurai Maiden (2022) as Shingen Takeda

Discography

Albums

Singles

Mini albums

References

External links
Official blog 

1996 births
Living people
Anime singers
Aqours members
Japanese women pop singers
Japanese video game actresses
Japanese voice actresses
Sacra Music artists
Voice actresses from Saitama Prefecture
21st-century Japanese actresses
21st-century Japanese singers
21st-century Japanese women singers